Ocie Moore Austin (January 8, 1947 – July 22, 2014) was a professional American football defensive back in the National Football League (NFL). He attended Utah State University.

External links
NFL.com profile

References

1947 births
2014 deaths
Players of American football from Norfolk, Virginia
American football defensive backs
Utah State Aggies football players
Baltimore Colts players
Pittsburgh Steelers players